The 2013 French Figure Skating Championships took place between 13 and 16 December 2012 at the Patinoire Iceberg in Strasbourg. Medals were awarded in the disciplines of men's singles, ladies' singles, pair skating, ice dancing, and synchronized skating on the senior level. The results were among the criteria – along with FFSG minimum scores and jump requirements – used to choose the French entries for the 2013 World Championships and the 2013 European Championships.

Senior results

Men
Brian Joubert withdrew due to the flu. Florent Amodio won his second senior national title. Amodio decided to replace his short program with a shortened version of the previous season's free skating.

Ladies
Anaïs Ventard won her first senior national title.

Pairs
Vanessa James / Morgan Ciprès won their first senior national title.

Ice dancing
Nathalie Péchalat / Fabian Bourzat won their fourth senior national title.

Synchronized

Junior results
The French Junior Championships were held in February 2013.

Men

Ladies

Ice dancing

Eight other ice dance teams competed.

References

External links
 2012 French Championships at FFSG 
 Fédération Française des Sports de Glace (FFSG) 
 results (FFSG) 

2013
Figure Skating Championships,2013
2012 in figure skating